Christopher William Smith (born 9 September 1994) is a South African rugby union player for the  in the United Rugby Championship and the  in the Currie Cup. His regular position is fly-half.

He was a member of the  squad that won the 2018 Rugby Challenge, featuring in ten of their eleven matches and finishing as the competition's top scorer with 131 points.

Honours

 SuperSport Rugby Challenge winner 2018
 SuperSport Rugby Challenge Player of the Year 2018
 Super Rugby Unlocked winner 2020
 Currie Cup winner 2020–21, 2021
 Pro14 Rainbow Cup runner-up 2021
 United Rugby Championship runner-up 2021-22

References

Profile on itsrugby.co.uk

South African rugby union players
Living people
1994 births
Rugby union players from Cape Town
Rugby union fly-halves
Pumas (Currie Cup) players
Bulls (rugby union) players
Blue Bulls players